The civil parish of Tharston and Hapton lies in the south of the county of Norfolk, England. The parish had a population of 599 in 231 households at the 2001 census, increasing to 791 at the 2011 census.

In 2004 the parish had a population of more than six hundred people in 282 households. This increase from 2001 can be attributed to a new housing development in the area, in particular where the parish bounds onto Long Stratton.

Facilities 
A church is located in each of the villages: St. Margaret's in Hapton and St Mary's in Tharston. A Church of England primary school is also located in the village of Hapton.

Redwings Horse Sanctuary purchased Hapton Hall several years ago and now own a large area of land surrounding the farm.

A small industrial estate is located in the parish of Tharston, and although named after that village is immediately adjacent to Long Stratton.

Railways 
During the Victorian era, a small loop line was constructed from nearby Forncett village to the town of Wymondham. The line crossed the River Tas at Tharston, and a viaduct was built. Remains of the line are still visible.

Julia Thomas Memorial Concert 
In July 2008, the Tharston Jubilee Events Committee organised a "Proms in the Park" just for Tharston. All profits made went to the Priscilla Bacon Lodge at Coleman Hospital in Norwich. There was music from the Newton Flotman ARTS Choir, South Norfolk Youth Symphonic Orchestra conducted by Mike Booty and many other solo artists. There was an auction, and a Mustang and Spitfire flyover. A flight in the mustang was a prize up for auction.

The concert was also broadcast live on British Atlantic Radio, an internet radio station (now defunct) run from the village.

Notes

External links 

Tharston Village Website "Tharston Village Online."
Office for National Statistics & Norfolk County Council, 2001. "Census population and household counts for unparished urban areas and all parishes."

Civil parishes in Norfolk